The funeral of Princess Grace of Monaco took place at the Cathedral of Our Lady Immaculate in Monaco-Ville on 18 September 1982. Princess Grace had succumbed to injuries resulting from a car crash on 14 September, at the age of 52. An estimated 26,000 people paid their respects as she laid in state at the Palatine Chapel at the Prince's Palace of Monaco before the ceremony, a requiem mass.

Funeral service

Princess Grace's body lay in state in the Ardent Chapel in the Grimaldi palace where she made her home for 26 years. She was dressed in a high-necked white lace dress and laid on a quilt of orchids.  Afterwards, she was transported by funeral cortege led by her husband, Prince Rainer, and her children, Prince Albert and Princess Caroline through the streets of Monaco-Ville from the palace to the cathedral. Her youngest daughter, Princess Stéphanie, was unable to attend, still recovering from injuries sustained in the car accident.

The homily was delivered by Charles Amarin Brand, the Archbishop of Monaco. Brand stated in his homily that people were "united in pain" and emphasised the "senselessness and inexplicable nature" of "the rupture of the destiny of this humanly exceptional, religiously exceptional person". Brand said the Princess's Roman Catholic faith "modeled, indeed sculpted, not only the public person, but the deep personality of her being" and that her accident "results in stupefaction, and provides no answers to the questions of life, suffering, separation and death". The gospel reading was "In my Father's house are many mansions...I go to prepare a place for you" from John 14.

The music that accompanied the mass included an excerpt from Joseph Haydn's Symphony No. 4, Samuel Barber's Adagio for Strings and four pieces by Johann Sebastian Bach.

Grace's coffin was draped in the Monégasque flag and lay in the cathedral's Chapel of the Princes during the ceremony. A second mass was offered after the ceremony for Monégasque citizens. The Interment of the coffin in the Grimaldi family vault in the apse of the cathedral was scheduled for the following week, as the timing of the funeral service overran.

Prince Rainier was seated with Princess Caroline and Prince Albert at the ceremony. Grace's siblings; her brother John B. 'Kell' Kelly Jr., and her sisters Lizanne and Peggy, sat behind the Monégasque princely family. Four of Grace's friends who had served as bridesmaids during her wedding were in attendance, as was her former agent Jay Kanter and former co-star Cary Grant. The representatives of several reigning and non-reigning royal families and governments were also in attendance. Nancy Reagan, the First Lady of the United States, was a friend of Grace's and led the American delegation. She was seated with Danielle Mitterrand, wife of the President of France François Mitterrand, and Diana, Princess of Wales, wife of Charles, Prince of Wales, on behalf of Queen Elizabeth II. Diana had previously met Princess Grace at a music recital at Goldsmith's Hall in the City of London.

The rest of the American delegation consisted of the United States Secretary of the Navy John F. Lehman Jr., and Dick Thornburgh, the Governor of Pennsylvania, Evan G. Galbraith, the United States Ambassador to France, the Pennsylvanian Congressman Thomas M. Foglietta and Jacklyn Anne Cahill, the State Department Officer in charge of French and Monacan Affairs.

Other notable attendees included singer Eddie Fisher, Barbara Sinatra, the wife of the singer Frank Sinatra, and Jackie Stewart, the racing driver.

Attendees

Family

House of Grimaldi
 The Prince of Monaco, Princess Grace's widower
 Princess Caroline of Monaco, Princess Grace's daughter
 The Hereditary Prince of Monaco, Princess Grace's son

Kelly family
 Margaret Conlin, Princess Grace's sister
 John B. Kelly Jr., Princess Grace's brother
 Elizabeth Anne Levine, Princess Grace's sister

Foreign royalty

Members of reigning royal families
  The King and Queen of the Belgians
  The Prince and Princess of Liège
  Princess Benedikte of Denmark (representing the Queen of Denmark)
  Prince Philipp of Liechtenstein (representing the Prince of Liechtenstein)
  The Grand Duchess of Luxembourg (representing the Grand Duke of Luxembourg)
  Prince Bernhard of the Netherlands (representing the Queen of the Netherlands)
  The Count of Barcelona (representing the King of Spain)
  The Duke of Halland (representing the King of Sweden)
  The Princess of Wales (representing the Queen of the United Kingdom)

Members of non-reigning royal families
The Aga Khan and Begum Aga Khan
 Queen Anne-Marie of Greece
 King Fuad II of Egypt
 Empress Farah of Iran
 The Duke of Aosta
 Grand Duke Vladimir Kirillovich of Russia

Non-royal dignitaries
  Patrick Hillery, President of Ireland 
  Danielle Mitterrand, wife of French President François Mitterrand
  Claude Pompidou, widow of French President Georges Pompidou
  Claude Cheysson, Minister of Foreign Affairs 
  Jack Lang, Minister of Culture
  Archbishop Jacques-Paul Martin, Prefect Emeritus of the Papal Household
  Nancy Reagan, First Lady of the United States

Other notable attendees
 Cary Grant
 Jimmy Stewart
 Jackie Stewart

References

1982 in Monaco
Funerals by person
Grace Kelly
Monaco-Ville